Robert Aubinière (1912–2001) was a French military, born in Paris. He was director of CNES (1961–1972) and ELDO Secretaries General (1972–1975) (Director General of the European Space Agency).

External links

 CNES — Homepage 
 CNES — Homepage 
 CNES — UFO Data

CNES
European Space Agency personnel
Space technology research institutes